Île-Verte Lighthouse is a lighthouse on Île Verte in Notre-Dame-des-Sept-Douleurs, Quebec, Canada. Completed in 1809, it is the oldest lighthouse on the Saint Lawrence River and the third oldest in Canada.

History
Constructed between 1806 and 1809 on behalf of Trinity House in Quebec City, the lighthouse was responsible for the improvement and surveillance of the lower Saint Lawrence River. It was among the first lighthouses built in Canada, and was the first built on the banks of the Saint Lawrence. The Île-Verte Lighthouse illustrates the expansion of trade and navigation in the early nineteenth century and was an important milestone in the development of a network of safe waterways in Canada.

Keepers
 Charles Hembleton 1809-1827 
 Robert Noel Lindsay 1827-1867 
 Gilbert Lindsay 1867-1888 
 Irenee Lindsay 1888-1927 
 Joseph-Alfred Lindsay 1927-1964 
 Armand Lafrance 1964-1972

The last lighthouse keeper left in 1972.

Legacy
The Île-Verte Lighthouse served as a prototype for the construction of other lighthouses along the St. Lawrence, by its masonry construction, its cylindrical shape, small size and its overall simplicity. The longevity of the building and its continued use attest to the success of this design, which proved highly functional, as well as to the quality of materials and construction.

Heritage
The Île-Verte lighthouse reinforces the austerity of its location on the coast. The building is an important landmark in the region and is now a tourist attraction and a source of pride in the region.

Federal Building, it was classified a historic monument of the National Historic Sites of Canada in 1974 because of its historical importance, its relevance in terms of architecture and the special place it occupies in its environment.

See also
List of lighthouses in Canada

References

External links

 Aids to Navigation Canadian Coast Guard

Lighthouses completed in 1809
Towers completed in 1809
National Historic Sites in Quebec
Lighthouses in Quebec
Buildings and structures in Bas-Saint-Laurent
Lighthouses on the National Historic Sites of Canada register
Heritage sites in Quebec (Cultural Heritage Act)